Sir Hans Hamilton, 1st Baronet (died 1682) was an Anglo-Irish politician.

Hamilton was the Member of Parliament for Armagh County in the Irish House of Commons between 1661 and 1666. He was knighted in 1661 and on 6 April 1662 he was created a baronet, of Monilla in the Baronetage of Ireland. In 1673 he was made a member of the Privy Council of Ireland. Hamilton was Custos Rotulorum of County Armagh. His title became extinct on his death.

He married Magdalene, daughter of Sir Edward Trevor, and had one daughter, Sarah, who married Sir Robert Hamilton, 1st Baronet. Hamilton was the nephew of James Hamilton, 1st Viscount Claneboye.

References

Year of birth uncertain
1682 deaths
17th-century Anglo-Irish people
Baronets in the Baronetage of Ireland
Irish MPs 1661–1666
Members of the Parliament of Ireland (pre-1801) for County Armagh constituencies
Members of the Privy Council of Ireland